Chinle is a census-designated place in Arizona on the Navajo Nation.

Chinle may also refer to:
 Chinle Formation, a geologic formation in the southwestern United States
 Chinle Valley, a valley of the Navajo Nation, in northeast Arizona and southeast Utah